Jaume Cabré i Fabré (born 1947) is a Catalan philologist, novelist and screenwriter. He was one of the founders of the Catalan literary collective, Ofèlia Dracs.

He was born in Terrassa. He graduated in Catalan Philology from the University of Barcelona, is a high-school teacher on leave of absence, professor at the University of Lleida, and a member of the Philological Section of the Institut d'Estudis Catalans.

During many years he has combined literary writing with teaching. He has also worked in television and cinematographic scriptwriting. He collaborated with Joaquim Maria Puyal as creator and scriptwriter of the first Catalan television series: La Granja (1989–1992), followed by other shows like Estació d'Enllaç (1994–1998), Crims (2000) and the made-for-television movies La dama blanca (1987), Nines russes (2003) and Sara (2003). He also wrote, together with Jaume Fuster, Vicenç Villatoro and Antoni Verdaguer, the script for Antoni Verdaguer's films La teranyina (1990), based on his novel, and Havanera (1993).

His literary work

The beginnings 
He started with two collections of short stories: Faules de mal desar (1974) and Toquen a morts (1977).

His first novel, Galceran l'heroi de la guerra negra (1978) brings up the recurrent subjects of his work: power and the human condition. The character of the bandit Jaume Galceran, full of contradictions, is portrayed as a reluctant hero during the War of the Matiners (Second Carlist War).

In the second novel, Carn d'olla (1978), a very different character stands out, Barringa Barranga, an ex-prostitute who has established a network of relationships in the Barcelona neighborhood of Sant Antoni.

In El mirall i l'ombra (The mirror and the shadow—1980) music appears for the first time and, in a certain way, the reflection on the value of artistic creation, which will be constant subjects of his work from this point forward.

In 1980 he published a work of juvenile fiction, the novel La història que en Roc Pons no coneixia and a year later, the short story El blauet.

The consolidation 
During 1984 and 1985 three novels appear that will form the Cicle de Feixes, in which he had worked for many years. In 1984 La teranyina is published, a story set during Barcelona's Tragic Week and which narrates the events of those moments not in Barcelona but in the neighboring fictional city of Feixes, based on the actual city of Terrassa. The fight for political, economic and family power is reflected in the movements of several members of the Rigau family and of the other characters that live in this novel.

The same 1984 sees the publication of Fra Junoy o l'agonia dels sons a novel that develops slowly, like all of Cabré's novels from now on, where, besides the underground movements of the Feixes' ecclesiastical world and the monastery of la Ràpita of which the protagonist friar is the confessor, music plays a very important role. Some of the characters in La teranyina and the world of Feixes are also present in this novel, which in a certain way is its continuation. It highlights the figure of Fra Junoy, who is a kind of victim of those who have the power of manipulation.

In 1985 the final chapter of the Freixes Cycle Luvowski o la desraó was published as a novelette, in a larger collection of short stories: Llibre de preludis, in which music plays an even more prominent role.

In 1984 Cabré published his second work of juvenile fiction: L'home de Sau.

Maturity 
In 1991 Senyoria is released, a novel about the judicial corruption that emanates from absolute power, set in Barcelona at the end of the 18th century. If with Fra Junoy he painted a victim, now with don Rafel Massó, the civil regent of the Court of Barcelona, he paints the figure of the hangman, with all his fears and selfishness.

L'ombra de l'eunuc (1996) is a novel that recounts the last years of Franquism, the Transition and the years that followed from the author's perspective, personified in Miquel Gensana, the protagonist. At the same time it is a novel of reflection about artistic creation and, especially, about creating music. The story structure is based on the structure of Alban Berg's Concerto for violin and orchestra.

While Cabré began work on the following novel, he also began to branch out into other genres. In 1999 he published El sentit de la ficció, an essay on literary creation, writing, and about his own cooking.

In 2000 there is a return to fiction with Viatge d'hivern, a collection of fourteen stories that are interrelated by hidden impulses. The reader keeps on discovering these relationships as he advances in the stories; and the ties remain even though each story is set in very different places and periods. It is a look at a Europe that we have not been able to construct in any other way.

The following year, 2001, he published and performed for the first time in the Teatre Nacional de Catalunya, with the play Pluja seca, in which he wrote about forgery of the historical memory and about the fact that history is written by the victors. The drama starts in the castle at Peníscola, which has been converted into a Papish court (true for them, schismatic for Rome) on the day that Benedict XIII dies and the decimated cardenalici school decides to nominate a successor who is viewed in Rome as an antipope.

Les veus del Pamano (2004) begins in the forties, in a little village at the foot of the Catalan Pyrenees, Pallars Sobirà, and it continues to the present day, with a parade of characters like the teachers Oriol Fontelles and Tina Bros, or the woman Elisenda Vilabrú. The historical memory, the impossibility of forgiveness and the fear to forget are some of the subjects that turn up in this novel.

In 2005 he published his second essay: La matèria de l'esperit about literary reading.

His latest novel, Jo confesso (Confessions), was published in Catalan in 2011. In it, the author reflects on the concept of evil throughout human history through the life of a cultured and intelligent main character born in post-Civil War Barcelona. The English edition was published in 2015 by Arcadia Books in London.

Bibliography

Collections of short stories 
 Faules de mal desar (Ed. Selecta. Barcelona, 1974).
 Toquen a morts (Ed. La Magrana. Barcelona, 1977).
 Tarda lliure (1981) (Premi “Recull”, 1980).
 Llibre de preludis (Ed. 62. Barcelona, 1985).  Ed. Proa. B, 2002.
 Viatge d’hivern (Ed. Proa. Barcelona, 2000).

Novels 
 Galceran, l’heroi de la guerra negra (Ed. Proa, Barcelona).
 Carn d’olla. (Ed. Moll. Majorca, 1978). Ed. Proa, B 1999).
 El mirall i l’ombra (Ed. Laia. Barcelona, 1980).
 La teranyina (Edicions Proa, Barcelona, 1984).
 Fra Junoy o l’agonia dels sons  (Ed. 62, B. 1984) Ed. Proa, B. 1998.
 Senyoria (1991) (Editorial Proa, Barcelona).
 El llibre de Feixes (La trilogia de Feixes) (Ed. Proa. Barcelona, 1996).
 L’ombra de l’eunuc (Ed. Proa. Barcelona, 1996).
 Les veus del Pamano (Ed. Proa. Barcelona, 2004).
 Jo confesso (Ed. Proa. Barcelona, 2011).

Essay 
 El sentit de la ficció (Ed. Proa. Barcelona, 1999).
 La matèria de l’esperit (Ed. Proa. Barcelona 2005).
 Les incerteses (Ed. Proa. Barcelona 2015).

Theater 
 Pluja seca (Ed. Proa-TNC. Barcelona, gener de 2001).

Juvenile Fiction 
 La història que en Roc Pons no coneixia (Ed. La Galera. B.  1980).
 L’any del blauet (Ed. Barcanova, Barcelona 1981).
 L’home de Sau  (Ed. La Galera, Barcelona, 1985).

Scripts 
 La dama blanca (TV movie) (1987).
 La teranyina (radio) (1988).
 Fins que la mort ens separi (radio) (1989).
 La granja (TV series) (1989–1992).
 La teranyina (film) (1990).
 Havanera (film) (1993).
 Estació d’enllaç (TV series) (1994–1998).
 Crims (TV series) (2000).
 Nines russes (TV movie) (2003).
 Sara (TV movie) (2003).

Translated works 
 Translations of Senyoria
 Spanish. Señoría (trans. Daniel Royo). Ed. Grijalbo-Mondadori. Barcelona, 1993. 2nd edition: Random House- Mondadori. Barcelona, 2005).
 Hungarian. Ömeltósága (trans. Tomcsányi Zsuzsanna.) Ed. Európa. Budapest, 2001.
 Romanian. Excelenta (trans. Jana Balacciu Matei) Ed. Merònia. Bucharest, 2002.
 Galician. Señoría (trans. Dolores Martínez Torres) Ed Galaxia. Vigo, 2002.
 French. Sa Seigneurie (trans. Bernard Lesfargues) (Christian Bourgois Éditeur. Paris, 2004).
 Portuguese. Sua Senhoria (trans. Jorge Fallorca). Tinta da China ediçôes. Lisboa, 2007.
 Albanian. Senjoria (trans. Bashkim Shehu). Institui i Librit & Komunikimit. Tirana, 2008.
 Italian. Signoria (trans. Ursula Bedogni) Ed. la Nuova Frontiera. Roma, 2009
 German. Senyoria (trans. Kirsten Brandt) Suhrkamp Verlag. Frankfurt, 2009.
 Dutch. Edelachtbare (trans. Pieter Lamberts & Joan Garrit).  uitgeverij Signatuur. Utrecht, 2010.
 Slovene. Sodnik (trans. Simona Škrabec). Beletrina. Ljubljana, 2018.
 Translations of L'ombra de l'eunuc
Lithuanian. "Eunucho šešėlis" (trans. Valdas V. Petrauskas) Alma littera. Vilnius, 2019.
 Hungarian. Az eunuch Árnyéka (trans. Tomcsányi Zsuzsanna.) Európa könyvkiadó. Budapest, 2004.
 Romanian. Umbra eunucului (trans. Jana Balacciu Matei). Editorial Meronia Bucarest, 2004.
 French. L'ombre de l'eunuque (trans: Bernard Lesfargues) Christian Bourgois Éditeur, 2006.
 Slovene. Evnuhova senca (trans. Simona Škrabec) Študentska založba - Beletrina. Ljubljana, 2006.
 Italian L'ombra dell'eunuco (trad. Stefania Maria Ciminelli) La Nuova Frontiera, Roma 2010
 Polish Cień eunucha (trans. Anna Sawicka), Wydawnictwo Marginesy, Warszawa 2016
 Translations of Les veus del Pamano
 Hungarian. To Pamano zúgása (trans. Tomcsányi Zsuzsanna) Európa könyvkiadó. Budapest, 2006.
 Spanish. Las voces del Pamano (trans. Palmira Feixas). Editorial Destino. Barcelona, 2007
 German. De Stimmen des Flusses (trans. Kirsten Brandt). Insel-Suhrkamp Verlag. Frankfurt, 2007.
 Dutch. De stemmen van de Pamano (trans. Pieter Lamberts & Joan Garrit).  uitgeverij Signatuur. Utrecht, 2007.
 Italian. Le voci del fiume (trans. Stefania Maria Ciminelli). La Nuova Frontiera. Roma, 2007.
 Portuguese. As vozes do rio Pamano (trans. Jorge Fallorca). Tinta da China ediçôes. Lisboa, 2008.
 Romanian. Vocile lui Pamano (trans. Jana Balacciu Matei).  Editura Meronia Bucarest 2008.
 French. Les voix du Pamano (trans. Bernard Lesfargues). Christian Bourgois éditeur. París 2009.
 Norwegian. Stemmene fra Pamano (trans. Kjell Risvik). Cappelen Damm. Oslo, 2009.
 Greek. Οι φωνές του ποταμού Παμάνο (trans. Evriviadis Sofos). Papyros Public Group. Athens, 2008.
 Slovene. Šumenje Pamana (trans. Veronika Rot). Učila International, 2010.
 Croatian. Glasovi Pamana (trans. Boris Dumančić). Fraktura, 2012.
 Serbian. Glasovi reke (trans. Silvija Monros Stojaković) Beograd, 2014
 Polish. Głosy Pamano (trans. Anna Sawicka). Wydawnictwo Marginesy, 2014.
 Translations of Fra Junoy o l'agonia dels sons
 Spanish. Fray Junoy o la agonía de los sonidos. (trans. Enrique Sordo). Espasa-Calpe. Madrid, 1988.
 Hungarian Junoy barát, avagy a hangok halála (trans. Tomcsányi Zsuzsanna) Európa könyvkiadó. Budapest, 2009.
 Translation of Viatge d'hivern
 English. Winter journey (trans. Pat Lunn) Swan Isle Press. Chicago, 2009.
 Spanish. Viaje de invierno (trans. Concha Cardeñoso Sáenz de Miera) Ed. Destino. Barcelona, 2014
 Translations of La teranyina
 Spanish. La telaraña. (trans. Enrique Sordo). Argos-Vergara, Barcelona, 1984.
 French. La toile d'araignée (trans. Patrick Gifreu). Editions Du Chiendent 1985.
 Translations of Llibre de preludis
 Spanish. Libro de preludios. (trans. Enrique Sordo). Espasa-Calpe. Madrid, 1989.
 Translations of Jo confesso
Lithuanian. "Prisipažįstu" (trans. Valdas V. Petrauskas) Alma littera. Vilnius, 2016
 English. Confessions (trans. Mara Faye Lethem) Arkadia Books. London 2014
 Polish. Wyznaję (trans. Anna Sawicka). Wydawnictwo Marginesy, 2013.
 Spanish. Yo confieso. (trans. Concha Cardeñoso Sáenz de Miera). Destino. Barcelona, 2011
 German. Das Schweigen des Sammlers. (trans. Kirsten Brandt i Petra Zickmann). Insel Verlag. Berlin 2011
 Italian. Io confesso. (trans. Stefania Maria Ciminelli). Rizzoli. Milano 2012
 Dutch. De Bekentenis van Adrià (trad. Pieter Lamberts & Joan Garrit) Uitgeverij Signatuur. Utrecht 2013
 French. Confiteor (trans. Edmond Raillard) Ed. Actes Sud. Arles 2013
 Albanian. Unë Rrefehem (trans. Bashkim Shehu) Institui i Dialogut dhe Komunikimit. Tiranë 2013
 Danish. Jeg bekender (trans. Ane-Grethe Østergaard) Turbine Forlaget. Aarhus 2014
 Norwegian. Jeg bekjenner (trans. Kjell Risvik) Cappelens Damm Forlag. Oslo 2014
 Hungarian. Én vétkem (trans. Tomcsányi Zsuzsanna) Libri Kyadó. Budapest 2014
 Turkish. İtiraf Ediyorum (trans. Suna Kılıç) Alef Yayınevi. Istanbul 2015
 Czech. Přiznávám, že… (trans. Jan Schejbal) Dybbuk. Praha 2015
 Russian. "Я исповедуюсь" (trans. Ekaterina Guschina, et al) Inostranka. Moscow 2015
 Korean. 나는 고백한다 1,2,3 (trans. Garam Kwon) Ed. Minumsa. Seoul 2020
 Translations of L'home de Sau (child novel)
 Spanish. El hombre de Sau (trans. Mercedes Caballud). La Galera, Barcelona, 1986.
 Translations of La història que en Roc Pons no coneixia (child novel)
 Spanish. El extraño viaje que nadie se creyó. (trans. Mercedes Caballud). La Galera. Barcelona 1981.

Literary prizes 

 Fastenrath, 1980. Carn d'olla
 Recull, 1980. Tarda lliure
 Serra d'Or Critics, 1981. La història que en Roc Pons no coneixia
 Sant Jordi, 1983. La teranyina
 Prudenci Bertrana, 1983. Fra Junoy o l'agonia dels sons
 Serra d'Or Critics, 1985. Fra Junoy o l'agonia dels sons
 Spanish Critics, 1985. Fra Junoy o l'agonia dels sons
 Crexells, 1991.
 Readers of “El Temps”. Senyoria
 Prudenci Bertrana, 1992. Senyoria
 Serra d'Or Critics, 1992. Senyoria
 Spanish Critics, 1992. Senyoria
 Prix Méditerranée 2004 to the best foreign novel. Sa Seigneurie
 National Prize of Literature, 1992. La granja
 City of Barcelona, 1997. L'ombra de l'eunuc
 Serra d'Or Critics, 1997 .L'ombra de l'eunuc
 Lletra d'Or, 1997. L'ombra de l'eunuc
 Fundació Enciclopèdia Catalana, 1999 Viatge d’hivern
 Crítica Serra d’Or, 2001 Viatge d’hivern
 Catalan writers prize to the literary trajectory, 2003
 Catalan Critics, 2005. Les veus del Pamano
 Premi d'Honor de les Lletres Catalanes, 2010
Maria Àngels Anglada Prize, 2012. Jo confesso

References

External links 
 Official web
 
 Documented biography by AELC
 Catalan PEN Club

Catalan-language writers
Writers from Barcelona
Premi d'Honor de les Lletres Catalanes winners
1947 births
Living people
Members of the Institute for Catalan Studies